Oleg Georgievich Pogodin (Оле́г Гео́ргиевич Пого́дин, born 3 July 1965 in Salsk) is a Russian film director and scriptwriter. His 2011 movie Home was nominated for four Nika Awards, winning the one for the best male actor.

References

1965 births
Russian film directors
Living people